The 2004–05 Ukrainian Hockey League season was the 12th season of the Ukrainian Hockey League, the top level of ice hockey in Ukraine. 12 teams participated in the league, and HC Sokil Kyiv won the championship.

First round

Division A

Division B

Group A 
 Khimik Sievierodonetsk - Dnipro-Spartak Kherson 4:4/4:3 OT

Group B

Placing round

3rd place 
 Dnipro-Spartak Kherson - Politekhnik Kyiv 3:21

Final 
 Khimik Sievierodonetsk - HC Berkut 1:3

Playoffs

Pre-Playoffs 
 Sdyushor Kharkiv - HC Berkut 2:0

Semifinals 
 HK Kyiv - HK ATEK Kyiv 2:1
 Sdyushor Kharkiv - HK Dniprovski Vovky 0:2

Qualification
 HK Dniprovski Vovky - HK Kyiv 2:0

Final 
 HC Sokil Kyiv - HK Dniprovski Vovky 2:0

External links
Ukrainian Ice Hockey Federation 

UKHL
Ukrainian Hockey Championship seasons
Ukr